Esko Elstelä (15 November 1931 – 30 September 2007) was a Finnish screenwriter and film director. His 1964 film Onnelliset leikit was entered into the 4th Moscow International Film Festival. Elstelä worked as a director at the Finnish National Theatre from 1974 to 1994. He also translated many plays into Finnish.

Selected filmography
 Onnelliset leikit (1964)

References

External links

1931 births
2007 deaths
People from Pori
Finnish screenwriters
Finnish film directors
20th-century screenwriters